Saint Tydfil's Hospital (Welsh: Ysbyty Sant Tydfil) was a rehabilitation hospital in Merthyr Tydfil, Wales. It was managed by the Cwm Taf Morgannwg University Health Board. The entrance block, which is still standing, is a Grade II listed building.

History
The hospital has its origins in the Merthyr Tydfil Union Workhouse and Infirmary which opened in September 1853. An entrance block was completed in 1870 and a new hospital was opened to the north of the workhouse in 1899. It became the Tydfil Public Assistance Institution in 1930 and, after joining the National Health Service in 1948, it received a visit from the Queen Mother in 1987. After patients had transferred to Ysbyty Cwm Cynon, it closed in 2012 and most of the workhouse buildings were demolished in 2015.

References

Infrastructure completed in 1853
Hospital buildings completed in 1867
Hospitals in Merthyr Tydfil County Borough
Hospitals established in 1853
Defunct hospitals in Wales
Poor law infirmaries
Hospitals disestablished in 2013
1853 establishments in Wales
2013 disestablishments in Wales